is a Japanese actor, TV personality and seiyu. Born in Muroran, Hokkaido, he is a member of Team Nacs. He is a graduate of Hokkaido Muroran Sakae High School and Hokkai Gakuen University. Fumio Yasuda is his older brother.

Biography 
At Hokkai Gakuen University, Yasuda joined the theater club and the theatrical company OOPARTS (led by its president Takayuki Suzui). In 1996, following graduation, Yasuda and theater club friends Hiroyuki Morisaki, Shigeyuki Totsugi, Yo Oizumi, and Takuma Oto'o created TEAM NACS.  The team was disbanded after their first performance.

After graduating from university, Yasuda began working as a medical office worker. He stopped after 10 months because he wanted to concentrate on activities in the performing arts. After leaving the medical office, he worked part-time in Hokkaido, taking on jobs such as helping at a hotel breakfast buffet. Even during his part-time work, he continued to focus on his career in entertainment.

In 1997, Morisaki reunited TEAM NACS and Yasuda joined the group once more. Since 1998, he has appeared semi-regularly as a suit actor for the mascot character "on-chan" in "How Do You Like Wednesday?". 

TEAM NACS held its first stage performance in May 2004, in Tokyo. In 2006, Yasuda made his first appearance in the national online drama series "Jirocho Seoi Fuji" (NHK). Since then, he has also appeared in serial dramas and movies of the Tokyo flagship station, and has also held starring roles in TV series.

Filmography 
Bold is starring.

TV dramas 

 Sikoku R-14 (2001, HTB)
 Natsu no Yakusoku (2002, HTB)
 Jirocho Seoi Huji (2005, NHK)
 Taiga drama Kōmyō ga Tsuji (2006, NHK)
 The Pride of the Temp (2007, NTV)
 Hotaru no Hikari (2007–2010, NTV)
Edison no Haha (2008, TBS)
Lost Time Life (2008, CX)
average (2008, CX)
Asadora (NHK)
 Hitomi (2008)
 Natsuzora (2019)
 Sensei wa Erai (2008, NTV)
Oyakoko Play (2008, MBS)
The Naminori Restaurant (2008, NTV)
Kaettekuruka!? 33hunntantei (2008, NTV)
Call Center no Koibito (2009, ABC/EX)
Hataraku Gonn! (2009, NTV)
Shōkōjo Seira (2009, TBS)
Mieruhi (2009, HTB)
TAXMAN (2010, MX/TVK)
SPEC (2011, TBS)
THE MUSIC SHOW (2011, NTV)
Kaze wo Atsumete (2011, NHK)
Team Batista (2011–2014, KTV)
Yūsha Yoshihiko to Maō no Shiro (2011, TX)
Tsukaharatoden (2011, NHK)
Dirty Mama! (2012, NTV)
Soup Corry (2012, HBC/TBS)
Beautiful Rain (2012, CX)
THE QUIZ (2012, NTV)
Going My Home (2012, KTV)
All Esper Dayo! (2013, TX)
All Esper Dayo! SP (2015, TX)
Mondai no Aru Restaurant (2015, CX)
Shitamachi roketto (2015–2018, TBS)
Jūhan Shuttai! (2016, TBS)
Tsumi no Senso (2017, KTV)
Chisana Kyojin (2017, TBS)
Channel wa Sonomama! (2019, HTB)
Zekkyo (2019, Wowow)
Hakui no Senshi
If Talking Paid (2019, NTV)
Kiroi Renga (2020, NHK)
Aribai Kuzushi Uketamawimasu (2020, EX)
Food Lore "Life in a Box" (2020, HBO)
America ni Makenakatta Otoko (2020, TX)
Good Luck! Team Nacs (2021, Wowow)
Kiyoshiko (2021, NHK)
Dragon Sakura (2021, TBS)
Love with a Case (2022, NTV), Masumi Morizono

Film 
 Gamera 2: Attack of Legion (1996)
 Man-hole (2001)
 Pakodatejinn (2002)
 River (2003)
 Gin no Engels (2004)
 Into the Sun (2005)
 Ame no Machi (2006)
 Presents: Sea Urchin Rice Cracker (2006)
 GeGeGe no Kitarō (2007)
 Tatoe Sekaiga Owattemo (2007)
 Mayu -Kokoro no Hoshi- (2007)
 TEAM NACS FILMS "N43°" (2009) – Also in charge of director and screenplay
 Chasing My Girl (2009)
 Giniro no Ame (2009)
 Hotaru no Hikari (2012)
 Rakugo Eiga (2013)
 Hentai Kamen (2013)
 SPEC: Close Zen no Hen (2013)
 SPEC: Close Kou no Hen (2013)
 Black Butler (2014)
 Jossy's (2014)
 My Hawaiian Discovery (2014)
 Ogawamachi Serenaade (2014)
 Again (2015)
 Ryuzo and the Seven Henchmen (2015)
 Flying Colors (2015)
 Shinjuku Swan (2015)
 All Esper Dayo! (2015)
 Haiyu kameokatakuji (2016)
 Hentai Kamen: Abnormal Crisis (2016)
 Ninkyō yarō (2016)
 Satoshi: A Move for Tomorrow (2016)
 Closest Love to Heaven (2017)
 Reminiscence (2017)
 Gintama (2017)
 Hunohan (2018)
 Sakura Guardian in the North (2018) – Hisashi Sugimoto
 When I Get Home, My Wife Always Pretends to Be Dead. (2018) – Jun Kagami
 Come On Irene (2018)
 The Fable (2019) – Ebihara
 The Fable: The Killer Who Doesn't Kill (2021) – Ebihara
 Haha o nakushita toki, boku wa ikotsu o tabetai to omotta. (2019) – Satoshi Miyagawa
 Urakage (2020)
 Hotel Royal (2020) – Daikichi Tanaka
 Struggling Man (2021) – Haruo Izawa
Good Luck! Team Nacs: Movie Version (2021) – Himself
 Ring Wandering (2022)
 Tombi: Father and Son (2022) – Shōun
 Fragments of the Last Will (2022) –  Hara
 In Love and Deep Water (2023) – Michihiko Kuruma

Variety Shows 
 How Do You Like Wednesday? (1996–2002, HTB)
 Hanatare NACS (2003–, HTB)

Voice acting roles 
 Spirited Away (2001) – Radish Spirit
 The Cat Returns (2002) – Additional Voices
 Howl's Moving Castle (2004) – Soldier
 When Marnie Was There (2014) – Toichi
 DC Superheroes vs. Eagle Talon (2017) – Joker
 Dragon Quest: Your Story (2019) – Pusan
 The Bad Guys (2022) – Snake

Video Games 
 Professor Layton and the Diabolical Box (2007) - Sammy Thunder
 Yakuza: Like a Dragon (2020) - Yu Nanba

References

External links 

 
 
 Official profile – CREATIVE OFFICE CUE（in Japanese）
 TEAM NACS Official profile – Amuse Inc.（in Japanese）
 

1973 births
Living people
Japanese male film actors
Japanese male television actors
Japanese male video game actors
Japanese male voice actors
Male voice actors from Hokkaido
People from Muroran, Hokkaido
Amuse Inc. talents
20th-century Japanese male actors
21st-century Japanese male actors